Platygillellus rubellulus, the Shortfin sand stargazer, is a species of sand stargazer endemic native to the waters around the Galapagos Islands where it prefers to live in areas of fine-grained sediments at depths of from .  It can reach a maximum length of  SL.

References

External links
 Photograph

rubellulus
Fish described in 1912